Edward Costigan may refer to:
 Edward P. Costigan, U.S. senator from Colorado
 Edward A. Costigan, Boston, Massachusetts shipbuilder